Aaron Weis and Adam Weis (sometimes misspelled Weiss) are American former child actors and school teachers. They are known for sharing the role of four-year-old Bradley Bradshaw in the 1986 film Top Gun. Their appearance was reprised in the 2022 sequel Top Gun: Maverick.

Life 
The Weis brothers come from San Diego, born to Dennis and Martha Weis. In 1985, they were hired for the film Top Gun starring Tom Cruise after winning a movie casting, held at Point Loma for four-year-old identical twins. Taking turns on set for three days of filming, they played the young Bradley Bradshaw, son of Nick "Goose" Bradshaw (Anthony Edwards) and his wife Carole (Meg Ryan), in three appearances. The first one shows Carole and Bradley uniting with Goose at the airport where Goose gives his son a toy F-15 Eagle, actually a Starscream figure from the Transformers franchise. The most memorable scene in Kansas City Barbeque has Bradley sitting on the piano where his father plays "Great Balls of Fire". They (respectively one of them) joined in reciting the lyrics on behalf of their film father's request "Sing along, Bradley!" The brothers were paid $384 each for their role.

Following the shooting of the film, names and pictures of the twins and their role were published in Viltis magazine in December 1985. Still, the film as published treated them as non-speaking extras; so they remained uncredited and largely unknown to the public. They were pictured in People magazine as "unknown extras".

After a few more casting calls, their only other appearance was in a SeaWorld commercial together with other twins, most notably Mary-Kate and Ashley Olsen, after which they did not follow an acting career.

They graduated in 1999 as co-valedictorians from Clairemont High School, subsequently from University of California, Santa Barbara and obtained their teaching credentials. Now they both work as teachers in San Francisco Bay Area. Adam teaches fifth grade at Berkeley Arts Magnet school (since 2008), Aaron sixth grade math and science at Rooftop Alternative School in San Francisco. Both have been awarded the title of Bay Area Teacher of the Month by the non-profit organization 826 Valencia, Aaron in September 2014 and Adam in May 2015. In May 2018, Aaron was named a San Francisco's 2017-18 Teacher of the Year honoree by mayor Mark Farrell.

Reprise of their role 
Several years after the release of Top Gun, the names of the Weis twins became publicly known. In 2011, a CNN iReport featured an interview with their mother Martha, including many photos from the set.

In 2018, it became known that the Top Gun sequel in production would feature the character of Bradley Bradshaw in a major role, played by Miles Teller, bringing the Weis twins to public awareness again. As only professional actors were auditioned, they did not come into question for the role. Asked on their opinion of the casting, Adam wondered whether Teller (born 1987) may be a bit too young for the role, but neither brother wanted to make a judgement before seeing the film.

In an early scene of the sequel titled Top Gun: Maverick, we see Tom Cruise's character Pete "Maverick" Mitchell looking over a pinned-up photo collection of his life, including the Bradshaw family. In the final cut of the film, several shots of the original film including little Bradley in the bar were reprised as flashbacks of Maverick in the scene where grown-up Bradley also plays "Great Balls of Fire" on a piano. This served to help explain their relationship and to deepen the emotional conflicts involved. Not included in the script, this was an idea of director Joseph Kosinski during the film editing phase.

References

External links 
 Tom Cruise movie sequel takes off without San Diego's 'Top Gun' twins
 Top Gun 2: Who Played Goose’s Son In The Original Movie (& Why They Were Recast)
 'Top Gun': Original Goose's Son Actors React to Miles Teller Replacing Them in Sequel

Living people
American male child actors
People from San Diego
Fraternal twin male actors
American twins
Year of birth missing (living people)